Epicopeia hainesii is a moth of the family Epicopeiidae first described by William Jacob Holland in 1889. It is found in the Korean Peninsula, Japan and Taiwan.

The wingspan is 55–60 mm.

Subspecies
Epicopeia hainesii hainesii Holland, 1889
Epicopeia hainesii matsumurai Okano, 1973 (Taiwan)
Epicopeia hainesii tsushimana Inoue, 1978 (Japan)

References

External links
Japanese Moths

Epicopeiidae
Moths of Japan
Moths described in 1889